Badara Mamaya Sène (5 March 1945 – 22 June 2020 in Rufisque) was a Senegalese football referee best known for officiating the 1992 African Cup of Nations final between Ivory Coast & Ghana.

He was a referee during three Africa Cup of Nations final tournaments (1988, 1990, 1992).

He also took charge of one match each at the 1988 Olympic Games (China vs Sweden) and 1992 AFC Asian Cup (Qatar vs China).

After retirement from football he served as the mayor of Rufisque between 2009 and 2014.

He died in 2020.

References

Extrernal links 

Profile at WorldFootball.net

1945 births
2020 deaths
Senegalese football referees
AFC Asian Cup referees
Olympic football referees